Sarah Smith is an English film director, broadcast producer, and screenwriter. She is the co-founder and former CEO of Locksmith Animation. She is writer and director of the animated feature films Arthur Christmas (2011) and Ron's Gone Wrong (2021). Smith began her career in radio before serving as a television producer for live action British comedy, including as writer for the Armistice news review shows. She later served various other assisting production roles in television, and as writer for the adult animated series I Am Not an Animal. She then joined Aardman Animations as creative director, going on to direct her first feature film Arthur Christmas. She left Aardman and set up Locksmith Animation to direct Ron's Gone Wrong.

Profile

Smith studied at the University of Oxford.

Smith met the comedy duo Lee and Herring and offered to produce a radio series. Their submission, Lionel Nimrod's Inexplicable World, was initially was rejected for commission. However, Smith threatened to quit if the series was not accepted, an action Lee described as "heroic". The idea was resubmitted and accepted, and would eventually be recreated as Fist of Fun.

She became producer for the Armistice review shows where she also served as writer. In 1997, Smith discussed her work on the UK general election special of Armistice. She explained there was an expansion of both news and comedy in media in years prior, and said "They've collided during the election so that all news programmes now apparently must have some comedy".

She became producer for the radio series The League of Gentlemen after discovering the comedy cast at Edinburgh Fringe in 1996, then as producer for the first series of its transfer to television that aired in 1999. Smith is regarded as an important figure in the creation of the series; BBC2 initially offered "a tiny budget", she successfully advocated for a larger budget of around £230,000 (GBP) for each half-hour episode to achieve high production values and cover on-location shooting in Hadfield, Derbyshire.

She became script consultant for the Brass Eye television special "Paedogeddon!", written and presented by Chris Morris. She was introduced to Morris to scrutinise his writing, and engaged in extended debates about comedy with respect to the topic matter of paedophilia, commenting "it was really important in that show that it did have a fundamental satirical intent". 

She became writer for the adult animated series I Am Not An Animal, marking her move towards the medium.

Smith was approached by Aardman Animations with a job offer to head their feature department; she had contacted Aardman in prior years with an interest in working on film scripts. Smith said she initially felt uncertain about accepting the role because she only had production experience overseeing live action comedy and drama. She joined the studio in 2006 expecting she would leave after six months,  but stayed on believing she was there at an important time for picking up new projects, saying "[there was] an opportunity to take a whole fresh path and look at what they wanted to do as a company".

As creative director she was co-executive producer for the 2012 film The Pirates! Band of Misfits, where she secured rights to adapt it from the books it was based on. Smith would go on to direct her first feature film, Arthur Christmas, which was released in 2011. In 2012, Smith expressed disappointment over Arthur Christmas not being nominated for the Academy Award for Best Animated Feature when a film such as Puss in Boots did that year, remarking, "you've got to be kidding me".

Smith co-founded the animation studio Locksmith in 2014 with Aardman executive Julie Lockhart, and with the financial backing of Elisabeth Murdoch. She directed the studio's first film, Ron's Gone Wrong, which was released in 2021. Smith left Locksmith in June 2021 and was replaced by Natalie Fischer as CEO.

Filmography
As director:
 Arthur Christmas (2011)
 Ron's Gone Wrong (2021)

References

External links

Living people
English film directors
British animated film directors
Year of birth missing (living people)
British radio producers
British television writers
British women television producers
British television producers
Women radio producers
DreamWorks Animation people